The 1981 season of the African Cup Winners' Cup football club tournament was won by Union Douala in two-legged final victory against Stationary Stores F.C. This was the seventh season that the tournament took place for the winners of each African country's domestic cup. Thirty-two sides entered the competition, with Estrela Negra de Bissau, Coastal Union, El Zamalek, Mbabane Highlanders, CS Nere, Zoundourma and Espérance Sportive de Tunis all withdrawing before the 1st leg of the first round and AS Saint Michael withdrawing after the 1st leg of the first round. No preliminary round took place during this season of the competition.

First round

|}

1:Both teams withdrew before 1st leg.

Second round

|}

1:EP Sétif were to play the winners of Zoundourma vs Espérance Sportive de Tunis.

Quarterfinals

|}

Semifinals

|}

Final

|}

External links
 Results available on CAF Official Website
 Results available on RSSSF Official Website

African Cup Winners' Cup
2